The 1991–92 Temple Owls men's basketball team represented Temple University as a member of the Atlantic 10 Conference during the 1991–92 NCAA Division I men's basketball season. The team was led by head coach John Chaney and played their home games at McGonigle Hall. The Owls received an at-large bid to the NCAA tournament as the No. 11 seed in the Southeast region. Temple lost in the opening round to the Fab Five of Michigan, 73–66. The team finished with a record of 17–13 (11–5 A-10).

Roster

Schedule

|-
!colspan=9 style=| Regular Season

|-
!colspan=9 style=| Atlantic 10 Tournament

|-
!colspan=9 style=| NCAA Tournament

References

Temple Owls men's basketball seasons
Temple
Temple
Temple
Temple